Deh-e Kaid (also Romanized as Deh-e Kā’īd; also known as Deh-e Qā’īd, Deh-e Qāyed, and Deh Qā‘īd) is a village in Zalian Rural District, Zalian District, Shazand County, Markazi Province, Iran. At the 2006 census, its population was 340, in 87 families.

References 

Populated places in Shazand County